The flag of the city of Quito and of the canton of Quito is defined by Article 1 of a municipal law known as Ordenanza Municipal N° 1634, passed in 1974, when Sixto Durán Ballén was mayor of Quito. The flag is divided into six equally wide vertical bands, of which the inner four are red and the outer two are blue. Article 1 also recommends that the flags be 2.40 meters by 1.60 meters, which makes it a proportion of 3 by 2. The exact shades of red and blue are not specified in that law, but the colors are meant to represent the blood of Quiteños and the seas and skies, respectively. In the center of the flag is the coat of arms of the city, or sometimes only the more simple castle, which symbolizes strength, nobility and loyalty to the city.

Previous flag 

The "Patriots of 10 de Agosto" adopted as their flag a red banner with a white sail, to indicate their opposition to Spain, whose military flag was white with the red sail of Saint Andrés (known as the sail of Borgoña). The emblem was used by the quiteño patriots who resisted the Spanish counterattack in 1812. They were captured by the royalist troops of Toribio Montes and Juan de Sámano in the Battle of Ibarra in December of that year. For a large portion of the 20th century, by an error in the transcription of the part of the Battle of Ibarra, it was thought  that the quiteño pavilion had been totally red, hung in a "white" horn. Upon the celebrations of the bicentennial of August 10, 1809, this was corrected.

References

External links
 Text of the Ordenanza Municipal N° 1634 
 Symbols of the City in the official web of the City council of the Metropolitan District of Quito

Flags of cities
Flags of Ecuador
Flag